Rupchandra Bista (9 January 1934 — 21 June 1999), better known as Rudane, was a Nepalese politician, philosopher and activist.

He was born on 9 January 1934 in Palung, Makwanpur District. In the 1970s, Bista started his Thaha movement to spread knowledge to the people of Nepal. He was a member of the Rastriya Panchayat.

Bista died on 21 June 1999. An upcoming biographical film, Rudane is based on his life, and Divya Dev plays the role of Rupchandra Bista. In 2014, the Government of Nepal named a local municipality Thaha Municipality after his movement name.

References 

1934 births
1999 deaths
20th-century Nepalese politicians
Members of the Rastriya Panchayat
Nepalese activists
Nepalese philosophers
Nepalese politicians
People from Makwanpur District
People of the Nepalese Civil War